The Juno Award for Traditional Indigenous Artist of the Year is an annual Canadian music award, presented by the Juno Awards to honour music created by Indigenous Canadian artists working in traditional music genres. Announced at the Juno Awards of 2021, it was presented for the first time at the Juno Awards of 2022.

It is presented alongside a new category for Contemporary Indigenous Artist of the Year. 

Prior to 2022, contemporary and traditional Indigenous artists were honoured alongside each other in a single category for Indigenous Artist or Group of the Year.

Winners and nominees

References

Traditional Indigenous
Indigenous Canadian music awards